Würselen is a town in the borough of Aachen, in North Rhine-Westphalia, Germany.

Geography 
Würselen lies north of the city of Aachen in the immediate vicinity of the tripoint of Belgium, Germany and the Netherlands. Its neighbouring settlements are, in clockwise order, the towns of Herzogenrath, Alsdorf and Eschweiler and the city of Aachen. Würselen is part of Aachen's Nordkreis quarter and is the only part of the city borough without external boundaries.

Subdivisions 
As part of the administrative reform in North Rhine-Westphalia and the related 1971 Aachen Act, the territory of the borough of Würselen was expanded in 1972 to incorporate the hitherto independent municipalities of Bardenberg and Broichweiden. Since then Würselen has consisted of the following quarters:

 Bardenberg
 Broichweiden
 Würselen

These are subdivided in turn into the following parishes:

Coat of arms
The coat of arms show the eagle of the coat of arms of Aachen in the topleft corner. The second quarter shows the coat of arms of the Rhine Province, however the bend also represents the river Wurm which flows through the town. The mining tools in the third quarter remember the mining history of the town, which dates back till the 12th century. The cross in the fourth quarter is the symbol of the prince-bishopric of Cologne, as the town belonged to the archdiocese of Cologne until the creation of the diocese of Aachen.

History
During the time of the Roman Empire, Roman soldiers were based at Würselen, on an area today known as "Mauerfeldchen" (small mural field).

The first mention of the town was as Wormsalt in 870. Between 1265-69, Duke Wilhelm IV of Jülich built the castle of Wilhelmstein. Since 1616 the town has been known as Würselen. In 1972, the neighbouring municipalities of Bardenberg and Broichweiden were incorporated into the town.

Twin towns – sister cities

Würselen is twinned with:

 Hildburghausen, Germany
 Morlaix, France
 Réo, Burkina Faso
 Campagnatico, Italy
 Ruichang, China

Notable people
Jakob Dautzenberg (1897–1979), politician (KPD), resistance fighter against national socialism, Reichstag deputy
Adolf Wamper (1901–1977), sculptor, created the  Black Madonna in the War Crimes Camp 'Golden Mile'
Jupp Derwall (1927–2007), football player and manager
Jupp Kapellmann (born 1949), footballer
Martin Schulz (born 1955), former leader of the Social Democratic Party of Germany, former President of the European Parliament, was Mayor of Würselen
Nadine Capellmann (born 1965), dressage rider
Der Graf (born 1970s), frontman and songwriter of the band Unheilig
Roland Bartetzko (born 1970), soldier, charged with murder, attempted murder and terrorism
Torsten Frings (born 1976), footballer
Norman Langen (born 1985), percussionist
Yannick Gerhardt (born 1994), footballer

References

External links
 Official site 
 German-Englisch Website

Gallery

Towns in North Rhine-Westphalia
Aachen (district)